The 2018 CS Autumn Classic International was held in September 2018 in Oakville, Ontario. It was part of the 2018–19 ISU Challenger Series. Medals were awarded in the disciplines of men's singles, ladies' singles, pair skating, and ice dancing.

Entries
The International Skating Union published the list of entries on August 30, 2018.

Changes to preliminary assignments

Results

Men

Ladies

Pairs

Ice dancing

References

2018 in figure skating
2018 in Canadian sports
Sport in Ontario
Autumn Classic International
September 2018 sports events in Canada